Harald Christopher Wegelius, born 13 September 1944 in Helsinki, is a Finnish former banker and show jumper. He was involved with the collapse of Skopbank in the Finnish banking crisis of the early 1990s, but was finally cleared by the Supreme Court in 2000.

Christopher Wegelius is the most successful Finnish show jumper and the latest Finn at the Olympics. He took part in the 1980 Summer Olympics finishing 12th place in the Individual Jumping Grand Prix. Wegelius was married to English-born Elizabeth Jane Murray from  1971 to 1981 and their son is the professional cyclist Charly Wegelius.

References 

1944 births
Sportspeople from Helsinki
Finnish bankers
Finnish male equestrians
Olympic equestrians of Finland
Equestrians at the 1980 Summer Olympics
Living people
Show jumping riders